This is a list of notable events in country music that took place in the year 1959.

Events
The first Grammy Award for outstanding performances in the country music genre is presented. The Kingston Trio wins the only country-specific award, for Best Country and Western Performance, with "Tom Dooley." It wouldn't be until the 1965 when more country-specific Grammy categories were started. Until 1966 (when the Academy of Country Music began presenting awards), the Grammy Awards would be the only method to honor remarkable accomplishments in the genre.
"Saga" songs, or stories where conflict was the central theme, rise in popularity. Notable examples include "The Battle of New Orleans" by Johnny Horton, "The Long Black Veil" by Lefty Frizzell, "Waterloo" by Stonewall Jackson and "El Paso" by Marty Robbins.
A young sharecropper's son named Buck Owens scores his first significant chart hit with "Second Fiddle." That song, plus the follow-up – "Under Your Spell Again", his first Billboard Top 10 hit – provides country fans with the earliest examples of Owens' trademark "Bakersfield" sound.
Dolly Parton records for the first time, on the small Goldband Records label. Her first recorded song is a rockabilly song called "Puppy Love."
George Jones scores the first No. 1 of his 50-plus year career with "White Lightnin'." Jones would go on to become the first artist to have No. 1 hits in four consecutive decades, his last No. 1 hit coming in 1983 with "I Always Get Lucky with You."
Johnny Horton's "The Battle Of New Orleans" is named the Billboard Year-End No. 1 song of the year both the Billboard country and Hot 100 charts. To date, it is the only time this feat has occurred.

Top hits of the year

Number one hits

United States
(as certified by Billboard)

Notes
 No. 1 song of the year, as determined by Billboard.
 First Billboard No. 1 hit for that artist.

Other major hits

Top new album releases
{|class="wikitable sortable"
!width="250"|Single
!width="125"|Artist
!width="90"|Record Label
|-
|Greatest!
|Johnny Cash
|Sun
|-
|Gunfighter Ballads and Trail Songs
|Marty Robbins
|Columbia
|-
|Hymns by Johnny Cash
|Johnny Cash
|Columbia
|-
|I'll Sing You a Song and Harmonize Too
|Skeeter Davis
|RCA
|-
|Satan Is Real|The Louvin Brothers
|Capitol
|-
|Songs of Our Soil''
|Johnny Cash
|Columbia
|}

Other top new releases

Births
 January 7 — David Lee Murphy, singer-songwriter of the mid-1990s.
 March 2 — Larry Stewart, lead singer of the 1980s country pop group Restless Heart.
 May 4 — Randy Travis, key artist of the new traditionalist movement of the mid-1980s.
 June 15 – Jeff Stevens, singer, songwriter and producer.
 June 21 — Kathy Mattea, folk-styled country artist of the 1980s.
 June 27 — Lorrie Morgan, country star of the 1990s; daughter of Grand Ole Opry favorite George Morgan.
 July 20 — Radney Foster, songwriter and one half of the late-1980s duo Foster & Lloyd; also, a solo artist during the early 1990s.
 August 7 — Michael Peterson, singer of the latter half of the 1990s.
 September 14 — John Berry, singer-songwriter of the mid-1990s.
 October 13 — Marie Osmond, member of the Osmond family who enjoyed success in the country genre during the 1970s and 1980s.
 December 8 — Marty Raybon, lead singer of Shenandoah.

Deaths

Major awards

Grammy AwardsBest Country and Western Performance''' — "Tom Dooley", The Kingston Trio

Further reading
Kingsbury, Paul, "The Grand Ole Opry: History of Country Music. 70 Years of the Songs, the Stars and the Stories," Villard Books, Random House; Opryland USA, 1995
Kingsbury, Paul, "Vinyl Hayride: Country Music Album Covers 1947–1989," Country Music Foundation, 2003
Millard, Bob, "Country Music: 70 Years of America's Favorite Music," HarperCollins, New York, 1993
Whitburn, Joel, "Top Country Songs 1944–2005 – 6th Edition." 2005.

Other links
Country Music Association

References

Country
Country music by year